Indolestes is a genus of damselflies in the family Lestidae.
Species of Indolestes can be medium-sized, dull coloured dragonflies.
They are found from India through Asia, Australia and the Pacific.

Species 
The genus Indolestes includes the following species:

References

Lestidae
Zygoptera genera
Odonata of Oceania
Odonata of Asia
Odonata of Australia
Taxa named by Frederic Charles Fraser
Insects described in 1922
Damselflies
Taxonomy articles created by Polbot